Mirbelia ovata is a species of flowering plant in the family Fabaceae and is endemic to the south-west of Western Australia. The flowers are arranged in pairs or threes at the base of branches and are yellow or orange and purple and appear from August to October. It was first formally described in 1844 by Carl Meissner in Lehmann's Plantae Preissianae. The specific epithet (ovata) means "wider below the middle".

This mirbelia grows on undulating plains in the Avon Wheatbelt, Esperance Plains, Jarrah Forest, Mallee and Warren bioregions of south-western Western Australia, and is listed as "not threatened" by the Government of Western Australia Department of Biodiversity, Conservation and Attractions.

References

Mirbelioids
ovata
Fabales of Australia
Flora of Western Australia
Plants described in 1822
Taxa named by Carl Meissner